David S. Anderson (October 10, 1868 – March 22, 1897), was an American Major League Baseball pitcher who played in  and  with the Philadelphia Quakers/Phillies and the Pittsburgh Alleghenys.

External links

1868 births
1897 deaths
Major League Baseball pitchers
Baseball players from Pennsylvania
Philadelphia Quakers players
Philadelphia Phillies players
Pittsburgh Alleghenys players
19th-century baseball players
Wilmington Blue Hens players
Lebanon Cedars players
Sportspeople from Chester, Pennsylvania